Morchella miyabeana is a species of fungus in the family Morchellaceae. Described as new to science in 1932 by mycologist Sanshi Imai, it is found in Japan.

References

External links

miyabeana
Edible fungi
Fungi described in 1932
Fungi of Japan